Gala is an apple cultivar with a sweet, mild flavour, a crisp but not hard texture, and a striped or mottled orange or reddish appearance. Originating from New Zealand in the 1930s, similar to most named apples, it is clonally propagated. In 2018, it surpassed Red Delicious as the apple cultivar with the highest production in the United States, according to the US Apple Association. It was the first time in over 50 years that any cultivar was produced more than Red Delicious.

Appearance and flavour 
Gala apples are non-uniform in colour, usually vertically striped or mottled, with overall orange colour. They are sweet, fine textured, and aromatic, and in addition to being eaten raw and cooked are especially suitable for creating sauces.

History 
The first Gala apple tree was one of many seedlings resulting from a cross between a Golden Delicious and a Kidd's Orange Red planted in New Zealand in the 1930s by orchardist J.H. Kidd. Donald W. McKenzie, an employee of Stark Bros Nursery, obtained a US plant patent for the cultivar on October 15, 1974. It is a relatively new introduction to the UK, first planted in commercial volumes during the 1980s. The variety now represents about 20% of the total volume of the commercial production of eating apples grown in the UK, often replacing Cox's Orange Pippin.

Sports (mutations) 
Many sports of Gala have been selected, mostly for increased red color, including the popular Royal Gala. The original cultivar produced fruit with orange stripes and a partial orange blush over a yellow background. Since then, several un-patented sports have been recognized. Additionally, more than twenty sports have received US plant patents:

Unpatented varieties include: Auvil, Imperial

Descendant cultivar(s)

Delfloga (Royal Gala × Florina) 
Jazz (Royal Gala × Braeburn)
Envy (Royal Gala × Braeburn)
 Nicoter (Kanzi) (Gala × Braeburn) 
 Sciros (Pacific Rose) (Splendor × Gala)
 Sweetie ('PremA280')

Season 
Gala apples are grown from May through September in the northern hemisphere, but, like most apples, are available almost all year through the use of cold storage and controlled atmosphere storage. Australian Gala are available from late January. California fruit is available until October.
While the season usually lasts only 9 or 10 months, they are able to last all year round. However, due to some apples continuing to be grown in some orchards, and the fact that they can be refrigerated for some months leads to the availability of the Gala apple year-round in some Australian markets. These usually taste different (slightly less sweet) from those in season. The UK season begins in late summer (August). Storage makes the UK fruit available nearly year-round as with fruit from other origins.

Royal Gala sport 

Royal Gala is a Gala sport, patented by Stark in 1977, which produces redder fruits than the original cultivar. It is a pink-red dessert apple and is therefore usually eaten fresh. Royal Galas are usually harvested in early to late February in the southern hemisphere. In New Zealand, the pinker original Gala has almost disappeared as a commercial apple in favor of the darker-skinned Royal Gala.

References

External links

New York Apple Association description
JUSTICIA Patents – Apple tree named 'McLaughlin Gala'

Apple cultivars with patented mutants
New Zealand apples
Apple cultivars